Vuk II Krsto Frankopan Tržački was a Croatian nobleman and soldier of the Frankopan family, father of noted poet and politician Fran Krsto Frankopan. He was born about 1588.

He was the son of Gašpar I Frankopan Tržački, captain of Ogulin, and his wife Katarina née Lenković, daughter of Ivan Lenković, Uskoks leader. Educated in Ljubljana and in Italy, he started his military career as officer on the Croatian Military Frontier, later becoming a commander of Tržan Castle in Modruš (1612), captain of Ogulin (1618) and lieutenant colonel of Senj (1620). 
 
Vuk is most well known as head of the Karlovac generalate. During his reign, many fortresses were constructed and some expanded. Same thing happened in the area with many churches, some of which have survived to this day. He died in 1652. Vuk Krsto Frankopan is buried in the Franciscan church at Trsat, now a part of Croatian city Rijeka.

Sources

External links
Vuk Krsto Frankopan - general of the Croatian military frontier
Ogulin fortress - the ownership of V. K. Frankopan

1580s births
1652 deaths
Vuk Krsto
Croatian Roman Catholics
Croatian nobility
Croatian soldiers
Military commanders of Croatian kingdoms
16th-century Croatian people
17th-century Croatian people
Habsburg Croats
16th-century Croatian military personnel
17th-century Croatian military personnel
17th-century Croatian nobility